The Chyornaya is a river in Perm Krai and Komi Republic, Russia, a right tributary of the Veslyana, which in turn is a tributary of the Kama.

The main tributaries are Sol, Malaya Sol, Badya (left); Peles, Lel, Parmanka (right).

References 

Rivers of Perm Krai
Rivers of the Komi Republic